Agustín Gosio (born March 17, 1983) is an Argentine rugby union footballer. He plays in the wing and centre position.
Gosio started playing rugby for his secondary school, Colegio Cardenal Newman, moving afterwards for Club Newman. He was part of Pampas XV squad during 2010 and 2011 Vodacom Cup editions. In May 2010 he was selected in a squad of over 40 players to represent Argentina during Scotland's two test Summer tour of Argentina. He previously represented Argentina in 7's rugby. He was called for the 2011 Rugby World Cup.

References

External links
 
 
 
 

Living people
Argentine rugby union players
Argentina international rugby union players
1983 births
Rugby union wings
Rugby union centres
Club Newman rugby union players
Argentine expatriate rugby union players
Expatriate rugby union players in England
Argentine expatriate sportspeople in England
People educated at Colegio Cardenal Newman